Mike Davis Rodríguez Sornoza (born April 20, 1989) is an Ecuadorian footballer. He currently plays for Ecuadorian Deportivo Quito. He is considered to be one of the young promises of Ecuadorian football along with Jefferson Pinto, Fernando Guerrero, Michael Arroyo, Jefferson Montero, and Felipe Caicedo.

International career
Rodriguez made his appearance internationally in the 2007 South American Youth Championship. In May 2008 he scored a double against Deportivo Quito in Quito, making him an important figure for his club.

References

External links

1989 births
Living people
Sportspeople from Guayaquil
Association football midfielders
Ecuadorian footballers
Barcelona S.C. footballers
C.D. Cuenca footballers
S.D. Quito footballers